SHGR may refer to:

 Hail, in the METAR format for reporting weather information
 Super High Graphics Resolution, a graphics mode for the Apple IIGS platform